Nanon is a 1938 German historical film directed by Herbert Maisch and starring Erna Sack, Johannes Heesters and Dagny Servaes. It is based on the original operetta Nanon by Richard Genée which had a libretto by F Zell, although the music for this film was specially commissioned from Alois Melichar.

It was produced by the giant German studio UFA, and is part of a cycle of operetta films made during the 1930s. The film's sets were designed by the art director Erich Kettelhut.

It was a remake of the 1924 silent film of the same title.

Cast
 Erna Sack as Nanon Patin
 Johannes Heesters as Marquis Charles d'Aubigne
 Dagny Servaes as Ninon de l'Enclos
 Kurt Meisel as Hector
 Otto Gebühr as Jean Baptiste Molière
 Oskar Sima as Marquis de Marsillac
 Karl Paryla as Louis XIV
 Berthold Ebbecke as Pierre
 Ursula Deinert as Tänzerin
 Clemens Hasse as Francois Patin
 Paul Westermeier as 1. Korporal
 Armin Schweizer as 2. Korporal
 Oskar Höcker as 3. Korporal
 Ilse Fürstenberg as Die Magd
 Ludwig Andersen as Sekretär
 Walter Steinbeck as Mons. Louvois
 Hermann Pfeiffer as Mons. Duval
 Horst Birr
 Lucie Euler
 Angelo Ferrari as Gast bei Ninon
 Eric Harden
 Alice Hechy
 Max Hiller
 Willy Kaiser-Heyl
 Hermann Meyer-Falkow
 Ellen Plessow
 Klaus Pohl
 Walter Schenk
 Erhart Stettner
 Robert Vincenti-Lieffertz
 Egon Vogel
 Leopold von Ledebur
 Wolfgang von Schwindt
 Helmut Weiss as Verehrer von Gräfin Ninon de Lenclos
 Herbert Weissbach

References

Bibliography

External links 
 

1938 films
1930s historical musical films
German historical musical films
Films of Nazi Germany
1930s German-language films
Operetta films
Films based on operettas
Films directed by Herbert Maisch
UFA GmbH films
Films set in France
Films set in the 17th century
Remakes of German films
Sound film remakes of silent films
German black-and-white films
1930s German films